Eusebio Pedroza (March 2, 1956 – March 1, 2019) was a Panamanian boxer who held the WBA and lineal featherweight championship from 1978 to 1985, having defended the title against 18 different contenders, more than any other boxer in featherweight history. His cousin, Rafael Pedroza, was a world champion also, in the junior bantamweight division, although Rafael's reign as world champion was short-lived. Eusebio Pedroza died one day before his 63rd birthday.

Biography
Pedroza started out as a professional boxer on December 1, 1973, with a four-round knockout win over Julio Garcia. His first 15 bouts were all in Panama. He went 14-1 over that span of fights, including a win over Jacinto Fuentes, a boxer who would later draw and lose to Wilfredo Gómez. His one defeat over that period of his career came to Alfonso Pérez by a knockout in three.

For fight number 16, Pedroza went to Mexicali, Mexico, in the last week of March 1976 to challenge WBA world bantamweight champion Alfonso Zamora for the world title. In his first championship try, Pedroza suffered his second loss, being knocked out in two rounds. After returning to Panama, he beat Pablo Jimenez by a decision in ten, then lost to Oscar Arnal in Venezuela by a knockout in six. He would not lose again for nine years.

Pedroza won three fights in 1977, two by knockout, and then, in April 1978, the WBA featherweight champion, Cecilio Lastra of Spain, travelled to Panama to defend his title on April 18 against Pedroza, who knocked him out in round 13 to become the new WBA featherweight champion.

Pedroza, during the next seven years, travelled the world to defend his title. Among 18 fighters Pedroza defended the title against were Enrique Solis in Puerto Rico, in a 15-round decision win, former world champion Royal Kobayashi (in Japan), knocked out in 14, Sa Wang Kim (in South Korea), knocked out in 8, former three-time world champion and fellow Hall of Famer Rubén Olivares, who lasted 12, Johnny Aba (in Port Moresby, Papua New Guinea), who lost in 11, future world junior lightweight champion Rocky Lockridge, who went the distance with Pedroza in New Jersey and in Italy but lost by decision both times, Carlos Piñango (in Venezuela), knocked out in seven, Juan Laporte by decision, Jose Caba in Italy, also by decision, and Bernard Taylor in North Carolina by the way of draw. He also defended in his home country many times during that span, including a decision win over countryman and former WBA world Bantamweight champion Jorge Lujan, and became a household name in Latin America, his face appearing on the cover and posters of Ring En Español and Guantes magazines multiple times. Pedroza finally lost his title in England, being defeated by Ireland's Barry McGuigan in London in a 15-round decision.

During Pedroza's reign, talks surfaced of a unification bout against World Boxing Council and lineal featherweight champion Salvador Sanchez.  These hopes were dashed when Sanchez died in an automobile accident in 1982. By virtue of his win over LaPorte, who succeeded Sanchez as WBC champion, Pedroza was recognized as the new lineal featherweight champion.

Between 1986 and 1992, Pedroza tried various comebacks, going 3–2 in total on those comeback attempts.

He retired with a record of 42 wins, 6 losses and one draw, with one no contest, and 25 wins by knockout. He is a member of the International Boxing Hall Of Fame.

Pedroza was one of a few, whose fights inspired young Mike Tyson.

Professional boxing record

See also
 List of featherweight boxing champions

References

External links

Eusebio Pedroza, International Boxing Hall of Fame
Latino Sports Legends
Eusebio Pedroza's boxing stats

|-

|-

1956 births
2019 deaths
Sportspeople from Panama City
Bantamweight boxers
Featherweight boxers
World featherweight boxing champions
World Boxing Association champions
The Ring (magazine) champions
International Boxing Hall of Fame inductees
Afro-Panamanian
Panamanian male boxers